Ayaz Samoo is a Pakistani actor, model, host, VJ and writer. He is best known by his character name Sajid Billa on ARY Musik. In 2016, he won the AFA for Best Actor in a negative role for the film Moor.

Early life and career 
His debut in the industry was in 2004 with a music video for Geo TV. After that he appeared in several television shows and tele films on various Pakistani television channels including Geo TV, The Musik and Indus Music. He was then selected to represent Pakistan by performing for the second season of The Great Indian Laughter Challenge in 2006. This was where he was referred to as the 'Youngest Champion' on the show.
From his initials successes in the show, he was asked to participate in another stand-up comedy show 'Super Karara' in Pakistan and he won the title of 'Karara King' in 2007. He further on gave successful performances on Indian shows like "Funjabi Chakde" (Star One), "Comedy Champions" (Sahara One), "Comedy Club" (Sony Sab) and Laugh India Laugh (Life Ok). He then participated on another Indian show "Comedy Ka King Kaun" on Sab TV (India) in 2008 where he competed against 11 of the best Pakistani and Indian stand-ups and Ayaz Samoo won the title of 'Comedy ka king'. Ayaz made his film debut with Jami's spy-thriller O21 followed by Moor.
In 2016 he won AFA Best Actor in a Negative Role award for film Moor. He will appear in Aabis Raza's upcoming romantic comedy Maan Jao Naa opposite to Adeel Chaudhry, Hajra Yamin, Asma Abbas, Ghana Ali and Asif Raza Mir.

Filmography

Television

Awards and nominations

References

External links 

 
 

1987 births
Living people
Pakistani male television actors
Sindhi people
Pakistani stand-up comedians
Pakistani television hosts
Male actors from Karachi